Krisztina Raksányi (born September 26, 1991) is a Hungarian basketball player for PEAC-Pécs and the Hungarian national team.

She participated at the EuroBasket Women 2017.

References

1991 births
Living people
Hungarian women's basketball players
Shooting guards